Governor Blood may refer to:

Henry H. Blood (1872–1942), 7th Governor of Utah
Hilary Blood (1893–1967), Governor of the Gambia from 1942 to 1947, Governor of Barbados from 1947 to 1949, and Governor of Mauritius from 1949 to 1954
Robert O. Blood (1887–1975), 65th Governor of New Hampshire